The states of the German Confederation were member states of the German Confederation, from 20 June 1815 until 24 August 1866.

On the whole, its territory nearly coincided with that remaining in the Holy Roman Empire at the outbreak of the French Revolution, with the notable exception of Belgium. Except for the two rival major powers, Austria and Prussia, and the western left bank of the Rhine (which France had annexed, with tiny Katzenelnbogen), the other member states (or their precursors) had been within Napoleon's Confederation of the Rhine. 

The Austrian Empire, excluding the Kingdom of Hungary, the Principality of Transylvania, and the Kingdom of Croatia (all of which became parts of the apostolic kingdom of Hungary within the Danubian Dual Monarchy), the Kingdom of Lombardy–Venetia (constituting parts lost to Italy in 1859- viz. 1866), the Duchy of Bukovina, and the kingdoms of Dalmatia and Galicia (but including, from 1818 till 1850, Duchy of Oświęcim and Duchy of Zator)
Archduchy of Austria (split into Upper Austria and Lower Austria in 1849)
Kingdom of Bohemia
Margraviate of Moravia
Grand Duchy of Salzburg
Duchy of Carinthia
Duchy of Carniola
Duchy of Upper and Lower Silesia
Duchy of Styria
Littoral (consisting of Gorizia and Gradisca, Istria and Trieste)
County of Tyrol
Vorarlberg
The Kingdom of Prussia (excluding Posen, East Prussia and West Prussia)
Brandenburg
Pomerania
Rhine Province (until 1822 the Grand Duchy of the Lower Rhine and the Province of Jülich-Cleves-Berg)
Saxony
Silesia
Westphalia
The Kingdom of Bavaria 
Upper Bavaria 
Upper Franconia 
Swabia
Upper Palatinate 
Middle Franconia 
Lower Bavaria 
Lower Franconia 
Palatinate 
The Kingdom of Hanover (in personal union with the United Kingdom until 1837)
The Kingdom of Saxony
The Kingdom of Württemberg
The Electorate of Hesse (also known as Hesse-Kassel)
The Grand Duchy of Baden
The Grand Duchy of Hesse (also known as Hesse-Darmstadt)
The Grand Duchy of Luxemburg (in personal union with the United Kingdom of the Netherlands; lost over half of its territory in the west to Belgium in the breakup of the United Kingdom of the Netherlands in 1839, thereby resulting in the Duchy of Limburg becoming a member.)
The Grand Duchy of Mecklenburg-Schwerin
The Grand Duchy of Mecklenburg-Strelitz
The Grand Duchy of Oldenburg
The Grand Duchy of Saxe-Weimar-Eisenach
The Duchy of Brunswick (prior Brunswick-Lunenburgian Principality of Wolfenbüttel)
The Duchy of Holstein (in personal union with the Kingdom of Denmark; not a former member of the Confederation of the Rhine)
The Duchy of Limburg (became a member in 1839 in personal union with the Netherlands as compensation for territorial losses in the Grand Duchy of Luxemburg that were caused by the breakup of the United Kingdom of the Netherlands.) 
The Duchy of Nassau
The Duchy of Saxe-Coburg-Saalfeld (Saxe-Coburg and Gotha from 1826)
The Duchy of Saxe-Gotha-Altenburg (Saxe-Altenburg from 1826)
The Duchy of Saxe-Hildburghausen (dissolved in 1826; territory merged with Saxe-Meiningen)
The Duchy of Saxe-Lauenburg (in personal union with the Kingdom of Denmark)
The Duchy of Saxe-Meiningen
The Duchy of Anhalt-Bernburg (merged with Anhalt-Dessau in 1863)
The Duchy of Anhalt-Dessau (Duchy of Anhalt-Dessau-Köthen from 1853; Duchy of Anhalt from 1863)
The Duchy of Anhalt-Köthen (merged with Anhalt-Dessau in 1853)
The Principality of Hohenzollern-Hechingen (merged with Kingdom of Prussia in 1850)
The Principality of Hohenzollern-Sigmaringen (merged with Kingdom of Prussia in 1850)
The Principality of Liechtenstein
The Principality of Lippe
The Principality of Reuss Junior Line
The Principality of Reuss Senior Line
The Principality of Schaumburg-Lippe
The Principality of Schwarzburg-Rudolstadt
The Principality of Schwarzburg-Sondershausen
The Principality of Waldeck and Pyrmont
The Landgraviate of Hesse-Homburg (became a member in 1817; merged with Grand Duchy of Hesse in 1866)
The Free Hanseatic City of Bremen (still a constitutive state of Germany)
The Free City of Frankfurt upon Main
The Free and Hanseatic City of Hamburg (still a constitutive state of Germany)
The Free and Hanseatic City of Lübeck

The four free cities were republics by constitution, while all the others were monarchies, some constitutional and some absolutist.

The Duchy of Schleswig was never a member state. But Schleswig was traditionally connected to the duchies of Holstein and Lauenburg, which were member states. In 1848-51 (during the First Schleswig War), it was treated by the German states and the short-lived German Empire as a kind of member. In 1864, the Danish king transferred the three duchies to Austria and Prussia (after the Second Schleswig War).

Sources and references
Westermann, Großer Atlas zur Weltgeschichte (in German, detailed maps)
WorldStatesmen

 
German Confederation
Lists of subdivisions of Germany
Germany history-related lists
Germany geography-related lists
Modern history of Germany